Khoora , is a village and one of the 51 Union Councils (administrative subdivisions) of Khushab District in the Punjab Province of Pakistan.

References 

Union councils of Khushab District
Populated places in Khushab District